William Ingram is an American Professor of Literature Emeritus at the University of Michigan known for his work on early modern drama and performance. He was born in 1930.

Ingram earned the PhD at the University of Pennsylvania in 1966.

He is the author of The Business of Playing: The Beginnings of the Adult Professional Theater and A London Life in the Brazen Age: Francis Langley 1548-1602, a biography of the Elizabethan playhouse owner Francis Langley.

References

American academics of English literature
University of Michigan faculty
University of Michigan alumni
Possibly living people
1930 births